Martin Bencher (Scandinavia) A/S is a Scandinavian shipping and freight forwarding company, which was founded in the United Kingdom in 1881.

Martin Bencher was founded in 1997 by Bo H. Drewsen and Peter Thorsoe Jensen.

History

Business areas 

Martin Bencher Group transports all kinds of cargo - and specialize in the handling of PROJECTS and OVERSIZED / HEAVY cargo.

General freight forwarding

Shipping

Engineering and project management

Cargo handling and technical services

Port and agency services

Inland services

References

External links 
 
 Global Project Logistics
 Danish Marine and Offshore Group

Shipping companies of Denmark
Companies based in Aarhus
Danish companies established in 1881